Wisłok Dolny is a village in Sanok County in East Małopolska in the Lesser Beskid mountains, in the parish of Nowotaniec, Poland. It is now part of Wisłok Wielki.

History
The village was first mentioned in 1361. In 1785 the village lands comprised 6.14 km2. There were 820 Catholics and 41 Jews. 

Saint Onufrius Church was built in 1850, and still stands. A wooden church replaced an older church from at least 1828. 

In April 1946 a battle between the Polish army and the UPA took place. A dozen years after the war, the village started to rebuild. Many people were deported as part of ethnic cleansing from Wisłok on April 29, 1947 (Akcja Wisla) to the Pomorze area of Poland and many already had been deported to the Soviet Union in 1946.

Geography
The municipality lies at an altitude of 483 metres and covers an area of 6.3 km2. It has a population of about 200 people.

Villages in Sanok County